Melchor Fernández Almagro (4 September 1893, Granada – 22 February 1966, Madrid) was a Spanish writer, historian, journalist, literary critic, and civil governor of Baleares.

Members of the Royal Spanish Academy
Spanish literary critics
Spanish male writers
1966 deaths
People from Granada
1893 births
Recipients of the Order of Isabella the Catholic
University of Granada